Henry Spicer (1837–1915) was an English stationer and politician.

Henrry Spicer may also refer to:
Henry R. Spicer (1909–1968),  general in the United States Air Force
Henry Spicer (MP for Derby) for Derby
Henry Spicer (assemblyman) in 100th New York State Legislature
Henry Spicer (painter), see Gervase Spencer